Brummeckebach is a small river of Saxony-Anhalt, Germany. It flows into the Hassel in Hasselfelde.

See also
List of rivers of Saxony-Anhalt

Rivers of Saxony-Anhalt
Rivers of Germany